This all-time table compares national teams that have participated in the Rugby League World Cup by a number of criteria including matches, wins, losses, draws, total points for, total points against, etc.

This table also shows accumulated points, which treats each match as a group stage match (2 points for a win, 1 point for a draw, 0 points for a loss) and accumulates them together.

All-time table

See also 

 Rugby League World Cup records
 National team appearances at Rugby League World Cups

References

External links 

Rugby League World Cup
Rugby league records and statistics